Boncé is a commune in the Eure-et-Loir department and Centre-Val de Loire region of north-central France. It lies 15 km south of Chartres and some 85 km south-west of Paris.

Population

See also
Communes of the Eure-et-Loir department

References

Communes of Eure-et-Loir